Mimoceroplesis coussementi is a species of beetle in the family Cerambycidae, and the only species in the genus Mimoceroplesis. It was described by Breuning in 1967.

References

Ceroplesini
Beetles described in 1967
Monotypic beetle genera